Riccardo Chailly  (born 20 February 1953) is an Italian conductor.  He is currently music director of the Lucerne Festival Orchestra, since 2016, and music director of La Scala, since 2017. Prior to this, he held chief conducting positions at the Gewandhausorchester (2005–2016); the Royal Concertgebouw Orchestra (1988–2004); the Berlin Radio Symphony Orchestra (1982–1988); and the Teatro Comunale of Bologna (1986–1993). He was also the first musical director of the Orchestra Sinfonica di Milano Giuseppe Verdi (1999–2005) and principal guest conductor of the London Philharmonic Orchestra (1983–1986). Among the world's leading conductors, in a 2015 Bachtrack poll, he was ranked by music critics as the world's best living conductor.

Born in Milan, Chailly first studied composition with his father, Luciano Chailly, in his youth. He continued with composition at the conservatories in Milan and Perugia, but later shifted to conducting under  and Franco Ferrara. He made his conducting debut at La Scala in 1978 with Massenet's Werther, where he had been assistant director to Claudio Abbado since 1973. Upon becoming principal conductor at the Royal Concertgebouw Orchestra, he embarked on performing standard symphonic works—particularly Bruckner and Mahler—but expanded the orchestra's previously minuscule 20th century and contemporary repertoire. Long associated with the Gewandhausorchester, he is credited with having significantly raised their international status. He has also been the music director of the Lucerne Festival Orchestra since 2016, with a contract until 2026. For 30 years he has recorded exclusively with Decca, and recordings with the Gewandhausorchester have been particularly acclaimed.

Biography

Early life
Riccardo Chailly was born on 20 February 1953 into a musical family of Romagnol and French descent based in Milan. His father Luciano was a noted composer and arts administrator, holding positions at numerous Italian musical institutions, including as music director of La Scala. Luciano's oeuvre was centered around a neoclassical aesthetic, influenced by his former teacher Paul Hindemith, which granted him an epitaph as the "Italian Hindemith". Luciano married Riccardo's mother Anna Maria in 1950; Riccardo has two sisters, the harpist Cecilia Chailly and the television producer Floriana Chailly. Taken by his father to his first concert at age 6, Riccardo Chailly quickly became obsessed with music, explaining in a 2002 interview by The Guardian: "I didn't do anything else, and always chose music over regular boyhood activates such as sports". Chailly studied composition with his father, took private piano lessons and played drums in The Nameless, a free jazz ensemble. Despite Chailly's musical enthusiasm, his father was reluctant to readily encourage him. He was disappointed by his son's lack of interest in the technical aspects such as musicology, his general mediocrity with instruments other than the drums and wanted to avoid any appearance of nepotism.

Chailly studied composition at the music conservatories in Milan and Perugia. He later switched to conducting, studying with both  and Franco Ferrara. In his youth, Chailly also played the drums in a rhythm-and-blues band.

At age 20, Chailly became assistant conductor to Claudio Abbado at La Scala, where he made his conducting debut in 1978 with Werther by Jules Massenet. From 1982 to 1988, Chailly was chief conductor of the Berlin Radio Symphony Orchestra and from 1983 to 1986 principal guest conductor of the London Philharmonic Orchestra. From 1986 to 1993, he led the Teatro Comunale of Bologna.

Career
Chailly made his debut with the Concertgebouw Orchestra, Amsterdam in 1985. From 1988 to 2004, Chailly was chief conductor of the Royal Concertgebouw Orchestra (RCO), where he dedicated himself to performances of the standard symphonic tradition, notably Anton Bruckner and Gustav Mahler, with which the orchestra made its name but also significantly broadened the repertoire with 20th century and contemporary music. Among notable projects, Chailly led the 1995 Mahler Festival that celebrated the 100th anniversary of Mahler's first concert at the Concertgebouw. Chailly also conducted opera in Amsterdam, both at the RCO's annual Christmas Matinee concert as well as at De Nederlandse Opera (DNO), where his final opera production in Amsterdam was DNO's staging of Giuseppe Verdi's Don Carlo. One report stated that Chailly decided in 2002 to leave the RCO when, at his last contract negotiations, the orchestra offered him an extension for two years rather than five.

{{external media|align=cleft|width=220px|audio1=You may hear Riccardo Chailly conducting the Gewandhaus Orchestra  with Nelson Freire performing Johannes Brahms Piano Concerto No. 1 in D minor, Op. 15 in 2006 [https://archive.org/details/BrahmsPianoConcertoNo.1InDMinorOp.15/1.-maestoso-nelsonFreire.mp3  'Here on archive.org]|audio2=You may hear  Riccardo Chailly conducting the Gewandhaus Orchestra with Nelson Freire performing Johannes Brahms Piano Concerto No. 2 in B-flat Major, Op. 83 in 2006   Here on Archive.org}}

In 1986, Chailly conducted the Gewandhausorchester Leipzig for the first time, at the Salzburg Festival, after Herbert von Karajan had introduced Chailly to the orchestra. His next guest-conducting appearance with the Leipzig orchestra was in 2001, and after an additional appearance, he was named the 19th Kapellmeister of the orchestra. In August 2005, he officially became the chief conductor of the Gewandhausorchester Leipzig and general music director (GMD) of Oper Leipzig. His initial Leipzig contract was to run through to 2010. In May 2008, he extended his contract with the Gewandhausorchester to 2015. However, he concurrently resigned as GMD of the Oper Leipzig, reportedly after conflict over the hiring of personnel without his consultation.Peter Korfmacher, "Chailly hört bei der Oper auf – Verlängerung beim Gewandhaus". Leipziger Volkszeitung, 27 May 2008. In June 2013, the Gewandhausorchester and Chailly agreed on a further extension of his contract through 2020.  However, in September 2015, the Gewandhausorchester announced the newly scheduled conclusion of Chailly's tenure as Gewandhauskapellmeister in June 2016, four years ahead of the previously agreed upon contract extension, at Chailly's request.  His projects in Leipzig have included an international Mahler festival in May 2011, featuring 10 different orchestras.

Chailly became the first music director of the Orchestra Sinfonica di Milano Giuseppe Verdi (La Verdi) in 1999, and held the post until 2005. He now has the title of Conductor Laureate with La Verdi. In December 2013, La Scala announced the appointment of Chailly as its next music director, starting in 2017.   In August 2015, the Lucerne Festival Orchestra announced the appointment of Chailly as its next music director, effective with the 2016 Lucerne Festival, with an initial contract of 5 years.  In February 2021, the orchestra announced an extension of Chailly's contract through 2026.

Recordings
Chailly has an exclusive recording contract with Decca, and his recordings with Decca include complete cycles of the symphonies of Johannes Brahms, Gustav Mahler and Anton Bruckner. His Brahms cycle with the Gewandhausorchester won the 2014 Gramophone Award for Recording of the Year.  Other notable achievements include recordings of Igor Stravinsky, Edgard Varèse and Paul Hindemith. More recently, with the Gewandhaus Orchestra, Chailly has led recordings of Felix Mendelssohn, Johann Sebastian Bach, Brahms, Robert Schumann's symphonies in the re-orchestrations by Mahler, and a complete cycle of Beethoven's symphonies. His past recordings with American orchestras included Shostakovich: The Dance Album with the Philadelphia Orchestra and Stravinsky's Le Sacre du printemps'' with the Cleveland Orchestra.

Personal life
Chailly has been married twice. His first marriage was in 1974 to Anahi Carfi, an Argentinian-Italian violinist, with whom he had a daughter that year; the couple divorced two years later. He married Gabriella Terragni in 1982, from whom he has a stepson.

Earlier in his life Chailly was an avid partaker in extreme sports, including motorbiking, speedboating and parasailing. However, since a serious 1985 accident with him and his stepson, Chailly has abandoned these activities.

Awards
 2003: Feltrinelli Prize

Notes

References

Sources

External links
 
 Riccardo Chailly at Decca Records
 

Interviews
 Riccardo Chailly interview, 28 September 1990
 theartsdesk Q&A: Riccardo Chailly (27 November 2010)

1953 births
Living people
Musicians from Milan
Musicians from Leipzig
Italian male conductors (music)
Milan Conservatory alumni
Honorary Members of the Royal Academy of Music
Royal Concertgebouw Orchestra chief conductors
20th-century Italian conductors (music)
20th-century Italian male musicians
21st-century Italian conductors (music)
21st-century Italian male musicians
Italian people of French descent
People of Romagnol descent
Decca Records artists
Italian conductors (music)